The Régiment de Vermandois was an infantry regiment of the Kingdom of France created in 1643.

Lineage

 December 24, 1669 : creation of the  Régiment de l’Amiral de France, attached to the Levant Fleet
 Following March 1671 : the regiment transferred to land service
 January 1, 1791 : designated as 61 Line Infantry Regiment
 October 10, 1794 : the 1st battalion was reformed by incorporation to the 121st Battle Demi-Brigade during the formation of the demi-brigade. 
 June 19, 1795 : reformation, the 2nd battalion being incorporated to the 122nd Battle Demi-Brigade during the formation of the demi-brigade.

Equipment

Regimental Colors
3 regimental colonels out of 1 "white" Colonel and 2 of Ordinance « yellow, red, green and violet by opposition, & white cross »

Uniform

History

Colonels & mestres de camp 
 December 24, 1669 : Charles de Goyon-Matignon, comte de Gacé, brigadier on February 13, 1674, † October 1674
 November 1, 1674 : Charles Auguste de Goyon de Matignon, chevalier de Thorigny then comte de Gacé, brigadier on August 24, 1688, maréchal de camp on March 29, 1689, lieutenant général on March 30, 1693, maréchal de France on February 18, 1708, † December 6, 1729 
 March 29, 1689 : N. de Seiglières-Belleforière, marquis de Soyecourt
 July 19, 1690 : Armand de Béthune, marquis de Charost, brigadier on March 30, 1693, maréchal de camp on January 3, 1696, lieutenant général on December 23, 1702, † October 23, 1747
 May 5, 1696 : Antoine de La Vove, marquis de Tourouvre, declared brigadier on November 1703 by an expedited brevet on April 2, † January 1, 1706
 January 1705 : N. de La Vove, chevalier de Tourouvre
 July 27, 1709 : François-Lazare Thomassin, marquis de Saint-Paul, brigadier on February 1, 1719, † August 10, 1734
 August 26, 1733 : Louis Antoine, comte de l’Esparre then de Gramont, brigadier on February 1, 1719, maréchal de camp on February 20, 1734, lieutenant general on March 1, 1738, † May 11, 1745
 March 10, 1734 : Louis Marie Bretagne Dominique de Rohan-Chabot, duc de Rohan, brigadier on February 20, 1743, † 1791
 April 16, 1738 : Armand Henri, marquis de Clermont-Gallerande
 February 21, 1740 : N. de Froulay, chevalier de Tessé
 April 16, 1743 : Pierre François, marquis de Rougé, declared brigadier in November 1745 by expedited brevet on May 1, déclaré maréchal de camp on December 1748 by  brevet on May 10, lieutenant général on December 17, 1759, † July 17, 1761
 February 1, 1749 : César Jean-Baptiste de Valence-Combes, marquis de Thimbrune
 June 5, 1763 : Anne-Joseph-Hippolyte de Maurès de Malartic, comte de Malartic
 April 13, 1780 : Pons Simon de Pierre, vicomte de Bernis
 March 10, 1788 : Jean François Béranger, vicomte de Thézan
 February 5, 1792 : Jean-Joseph Christophe de Bazelaire
 March 23, 1792 : Claude-Louis de Chartongne
 April 11, 1794 : Étienne Alcher

Campaign and battles 
The 1st battalion of the 61st Line Infantry Regiment participated in the wars from 1792 to 1794 in Corsica and in Italy; the 2nd battalion participated in the same époque with the Army of the Eastern Pyrenees.

See also
Troupes de la marine

References

Sources and bibliographies 
Chronologie historique-militaire, par M. Pinard, tomes 3, 4, 5 et 8, Paris 1761, 1761, 1762 et 1778

Military units and formations established in 1643
Military units and formations disestablished in 1795
Infantry regiments of the Ancien Régime